Listroderes is a genus of underwater weevils, subfamily Cyclominae, in the beetle family Curculionidae. There are more than 184 described species in the genus Listroderes.

A 

 Listroderes abditus Enderl., 1907
 Listroderes acutesquamosus Germain, P., 1895
 Listroderes aequivocus Kuschel, 1946
 Listroderes affinis Hustache, 1926
 Listroderes albescens Blanchard, E. in Gay, 1851
 Listroderes angulipennis Germain, P., 1895
 Listroderes angusticeps Blanchard, E. in Gay, 1851
 Listroderes annulipes Blanchard, E. in Gay, 1851
 Listroderes antarcticus Germain, P., 1895
 Listroderes apicalis Waterhouse, 1842
 Listroderes appendiculatus Boheman, 1842
 Listroderes araucanus Germain, P., 1895
 Listroderes argentinensis Hustache, 1926
 Listroderes attenuatus Germain, P., 1895

B 

 Listroderes balfourbrownei Kuschel, 1952
 Listroderes biangulatus Champion, 1918
 Listroderes bicallosus Wibmer & O'Brien, 1986
 Listroderes bicaudatus Enderl., 1907
 Listroderes bidentatus Kuschel, 1955
 Listroderes bimaculatus Boheman, 1842
 Listroderes binodosus Germain, P., 1895
 Listroderes boliviensis Hustache, 1924
 Listroderes bracteatus Enderl., 1907
 Listroderes brevirostris Wibmer & O'Brien, 1986
 Listroderes brevisetis Hustache, 1926
 Listroderes bruchi Hustache, 1926

C 

 Listroderes carinicollis Germain, P., 1895
 Listroderes caudatus Gyllenhal, 1834
 Listroderes caudiculatus Germain, P., 1895
 Listroderes chalceatus Blanchard, E. in Gay, 1851
 Listroderes charybdis Morrone, 1993
 Listroderes chilensis Germain, P., 1895
 Listroderes cinerarius Blanchard, E. in Gay, 1851
 Listroderes cinerascens Blanchard, E. in Gay, 1851
 Listroderes comatus Erichson, W., 1847
 Listroderes compressiventris Enderl., 1907
 Listroderes confusus Hustache, 1926
 Listroderes corralensis Germain, P., 1895
 Listroderes costirostris Schoenherr, 1823
 Listroderes costulatus Germain, P., 1895
 Listroderes cupreosquamosus Germain, P., 1895
 Listroderes curvipes Germain, P., 1895
 Listroderes delaiguei Germain, P., 1895

D–E 

 Listroderes caudatus Gyllenhal, 1834
 Listroderes dentipennis Germain, P., 1895
 Listroderes desertorum Germain, P., 1895
 †Listroderes differens (Wickham, 1912)
 Listroderes difficilis Germain, P., 1895
 Listroderes dissimilis Fairmaire, L., 1885
 Listroderes distinguendus Gyllenhal, 1834
 Listroderes divaricatus Enderl., 1907
 Listroderes dubius Germain, P., 1896
 Listroderes elegans Hustache, 1926
 Listroderes ellipticus Hustache, 1926
 Listroderes erinaceus Germain, P., 1895
 †Listroderes evisceratus (Scudder, 1893)
 Listroderes exsculpticollis Enderl., 1907

F–G 

 Listroderes falklandicus Enderl., 1907
 Listroderes fallax Germain, P., 1895
 Listroderes fasciculiger Blanchard, E. in Gay, 1851
 Listroderes fascioliger Blanchard, E. in Gay, 1851
 Listroderes foveatus Kuschel, 1955
 Listroderes fragariae Schenkling, S. & Marshall, G.A.K., 1931
 Listroderes frigidus Germain, P., 1896
 Listroderes fulvicornis Germain, P., 1895
 Listroderes fulvipes Guérin-Méneville, 1839
 Listroderes fulvitarsis Hustache, 1926
 Listroderes gibber Enderl., 1907
 Listroderes gracilicornis Germain, P., 1895
 Listroderes griseonotatus Champion, 1918
 Listroderes griseus Germain, P., 1896
 Listroderes griseus Guérin-Méneville, 1839

H–K 

 Listroderes hispidus Germain, P., 1896
 Listroderes histrio Germain, P., 1895
 Listroderes hoffmanni Germain, P., 1895
 Listroderes horridus Germain, P., 18896
 Listroderes howdenae Morrone, 1993
 Listroderes humilis Gyllenhal, 1834
 Listroderes hyadesi Fairmaire, L., 1885
 Listroderes hypocritus Hustache, 1926
 Listroderes immundus Boheman, 1842
 Listroderes inaequalipennis Boheman, 1842
 Listroderes inaequalis Germain, P., 1896
 Listroderes inaequatus Schenkling, S. & Marshall, G.A.K., 1931
 Listroderes incanus Kuschel in Wibmer & O'Brien, 1986
 Listroderes incertus Germain, P., 1896
 Listroderes inconspicuus Olliff, A.S. in Whymper, 1892
 Listroderes insquamea Enderl., 1907
 Listroderes insubidus Schoenherr, 1823
 Listroderes katerensis Champion, 1918

M 

 Listroderes lacunosus Fairmaire, L., 1885
 Listroderes laevigatus Germain, P., 1896
 Listroderes laevirostris Germain, P., 1895
 Listroderes latiusculus Boheman, 1842
 Listroderes lemniscatus Champion, G.C., 1918
 Listroderes levicula Kuschel, 1952
 Listroderes liliputanus Germain, P., 1895
 Listroderes lineatulus Say, 1831
 Listroderes lugens Germain, P., 1895
 Listroderes lugubris Germain, P., 1895
 Listroderes magellanicus Germain, P., 1895
 Listroderes medianus Schenkling, S. & Marshall, G.A.K., 1931
 Listroderes migropunctatus Suffrian, 1871
 Listroderes montanus Germain, P., 1895
 Listroderes murinus Germain, P., 1896
 Listroderes mus Germain, P., 1895

N–O 

 Listroderes nigrinus Fairmaire, L., 1883
 Listroderes nigrinus Germain, P., 1896
 Listroderes nodifer Boheman, 1842
 Listroderes nordenskiöldi Enderl., 1907
 Listroderes novicus Schenkling, S. & Marshall, G.A.K., 1931
 Listroderes obliqua Kuschel, 1950
 Listroderes obliquus Dejean,
 Listroderes obliquus Gyllenhal, 1834
 Listroderes obliquus Klug, J.C.F., 1829
 Listroderes obrieni Morrone, 1993
 Listroderes obscurus Germain, P., 1896
 Listroderes omissa Kuschel, 1952
 Listroderes oregonensis LeConte, J.L., 1857
 Listroderes ovatus Boheman, 1842

P 

 Listroderes paranensis Hustache, 1926
 Listroderes parvulus Germain, P., 1896
 Listroderes percostatus Fairmaire, L. et Germain, P., 1860
 Listroderes philippii Germain, P., 1896
 Listroderes pilosissimus Schenkling, S. & Marshall, G.A.K., 1931
 Listroderes pilosus Boheman, 1842
 Listroderes pilosus Waterhouse, 1841
 Listroderes planicollis Blanchard, E. in Gay, 1851
 Listroderes planipennis Blanchard, E. in Gay, 1851
 Listroderes porcellus Gyllenhal, 1834
 Listroderes porcellus Say, 1831
 Listroderes praemorsus Schenkling, S. & Marshall, G.A.K., 1931
 Listroderes proximus Germain, P., 1895
 Listroderes pubescens Germain, P., 1895
 Listroderes punctatissimus Olliff, A.S. in Whymper, 1892
 Listroderes punctiventris Germain, P., 1895
 Listroderes punicola Kuschel, 1949
 Listroderes pusillus Hustache, 1926

Q–R 

 Listroderes quadrituberculatus Champion, 1918
 Listroderes reticulatus Germain, P., 1895
 Listroderes robustior Schenkling, S. & Marshall, G.A.K., 1931
 Listroderes robustus Germain, P., 1895
 Listroderes robustus Waterhouse, 1842
 Listroderes rugipennis Blanchard, E. in Gay, 1851

S 

 Listroderes salebrosus Enderl., 1907
 Listroderes scabra Enderl., 1907
 Listroderes schythei Germain, P., 1895
 Listroderes scylla Morrone, 1993
 Listroderes sobrinus Germain, P., 1896
 Listroderes solutus Boheman, 1842
 Listroderes sordidus Gyllenhal, 1834
 Listroderes sparsus Gyllenhal, 1834
 Listroderes sparsus Say, 1831
 Listroderes spoliatus Germain, P., 1896
 Listroderes spurcus Boheman, 1842
 Listroderes squalidus Gyllenhal, 1834
 Listroderes squamiger Gyllenhal, 1834
 Listroderes squamiger Say, 1831
 Listroderes squamirostris Germain, P., 1896
 Listroderes sticticus Germain, P., 1895
 Listroderes subaeneus Germain, P., 1895
 Listroderes subcinctus Boheman, 1842
 Listroderes subcostatus Waterhouse, 1842
 Listroderes superbus Reed, 1872

T–U 

 Listroderes teretirostris LeConte, J.L., 1857
 Listroderes thermarum Germain, P., 1895
 Listroderes trichophorus Philippi, F., 1887
 Listroderes tristis Germain, P., 1895
 Listroderes trivialis Germain, P., 1895
 Listroderes tuberculifer Blanchard, E. in Gay, 1851
 Listroderes ursinus Germain, P., 1896
 Listroderes uruguayensis Kuschel, 1952

V–W 

 Listroderes v.caudiculatus Fairmaire, L., 1890
 Listroderes varicosus Blanchard, E. in Gay, 1851
 Listroderes verrucosus Germain, P., 1896
 Listroderes vicinus Hustache, 1926
 Listroderes victus Germain, P., 1896
 Listroderes vittatus Guérin-Méneville, 1839
 Listroderes vulgaris Germain, P., 1896
 Listroderes vulsus Enderl., 1907
 Listroderes wagneri Hustache, 1926
 Listroderes wittei Hustache, 1926

References 

Cyclominae
Listroderes